Arnold Janssen, S.V.D. (5 November 1837 – 15 January 1909), was a German-Dutch Catholic priest and missionary who is venerated as a saint. He founded the Society of the Divine Word, a Catholic missionary religious congregation, also known as the Divine Word Missionaries, as well as two congregations for women. In 1889 he founded in Steyl, Netherlands, the Missionary Sisters Servants of the Holy Spirit and in 1896 at the same place the Holy Spirit Adoration Sisters. He was canonized on 5 October 2003, by Pope John Paul II.

Life and work 
Janssen was born 5 November 1837 in Goch in the Rhineland, Germany, not far from the Dutch border, one of eleven siblings. He developed a deep, simple faith. His first school was the Catholic Augustinianum High School in Gaesdonck, which is near his birthplace. He took up the study of philosophy at the Academy of Muenster, and then entered the University of Bonn. As a student in the university, Janssen entered a mathematics contest; he used the prize money to treat his father to a trip to the university and down the Rhine River; (his mother was too ill to make the trip).

Janssen was ordained to the priesthood for the diocese of Muenster on 15 August 1861. For a while he worked as a high school teacher in Bocholt, Germany, teaching physics and catechism. He devoted some years to pastoral work and the teaching of Christian doctrine, in 1873 becoming chaplain and director at the Ursuline convent of Kempen. In 1867 he became the diocesan director of the Apostleship of Prayer. This led to the founding in 1874 of the German-language journal Kleiner Herz-Jesu Bote (Little Messenger of the Sacred Heart), which looked to enlist the faithful in prayer and support for the mission.

The Kulturkampf, however, hampered his efforts, and Janssen purchased land in Steyl, the Netherlands, to begin his seminary, dedicated in 1875 as the "St. Michael the Archangel Mission House". Within a few years, many seminarians, priests and brothers were preparing there for missionary service, and the first two missionaries, Joseph Freinademetz and John Anzer, were sent to Hong Kong at the request of Bishop Giovanni T. Raimondi. The Society of the Divine Word received canonical approbation in 1901.

From the very beginning, a group of women, including Maria Helena Stollenwerk, served the community. Janssen also founded two congregations of religious sisters: The Holy Spirit Missionary Sisters (members known as "Sister Servants of the Holy Spirit") on 8 December 1889, and the Holy Spirit Adoration Sisters ("Sister Servants of the Holy Spirit of Perpetual Adoration") on 8 September 1896.

Arnold Janssen died at Steyl, Holland, on January 15, 1909.

Veneration

Janssen and Joseph Freinademetz, along with Daniele Comboni (an important missionary in Africa) were canonised on 5 October 2003 by Pope John Paul II. Janssen was elevated to sainthood after the healing of Pamela Avellanosa, a Filipina teenager living in Baguio who fell from a bike and was not expected to recover from the resulting head injury. According to her relatives and the Catholic Church, she was healed miraculously following prayers to Janssen.

In his hometown of Goch, the Arnold-Janssen-Church and the Arnold-Janssen-Community are named after Janssen. His birthplace can be visited in the Arnold-Janssen-Street.

The St. Arnold neighborhood in Neuenkirchen, Westphalia, has an Arnold-Janssen High School. It was founded 1929 by his religious community, but since 1996 it has been administered by the Diocese of Münster. The Arnold-Janssen High School in Sankt Wendel, Saarland, is also named for him, as is the Arnold-Janssen-Hauptschule in Bocholt.

See also 

Titian, Italy
Missionary Sisters Servants of the Holy Spirit
Holy Spirit Adoration Sisters
School of the Holy Spirit

References

External links 

Biography - Society of the Divine Word
Founder of the Missionary Congregation Servants of the Holy Spirit
 Bibliography concerning St. Arnold Janssen and St. Joseph Freinademetz, compiled by Fr. Manfred Müller SVD, Romae 2004 

1837 births
1909 deaths
Divine Word Missionaries Order
Dutch Roman Catholic saints
Founders of Catholic religious communities
German Roman Catholic saints
People from Goch
People from Venlo
Canonizations by Pope John Paul II
African-American Roman Catholicism